The keyed bugle (also Royal Kent bugle, or Kent bugle) is a wide conical bore brass instrument with tone holes operated by keys to alter the pitch and provide a full chromatic scale. It was developed from the bugle around 1800 and was popular in military bands in Europe and the United States in the early 19th century, and in Britain as late as the 1850s.

History
The first known mention of a bugle with keys appears on 4 April 1800 in London's Morning Chronicle newspaper, in an advertisement for an instrument built by instrument maker George Astor.
However, not until 5 May 1810 was a patent on a five-keyed bugle granted to Yorkshireman Joseph Haliday, entitled "Halliday's [sic] Improvements in the Musical Instrument called the Bugle Horn." Shortly thereafter, in 1811 the first known solos on the instrument were performed by trumpeter Henry Willman, brother of the clarinetist Thomas Lindsay Willman. Performances at the Theatre Royal, Dublin were announced with "Mr. H. WILLMAN will play a Concerto on that highly-improved Instrument, THE Patent Kent Bugle Horn, (INVENTED BY MR. JOSEPH HALLIDAY)". The first book on the instrument, which by then had six keys to enable more tones, was Introduction to the Art of Playing on the Royal Kent Bugle by Johann Bernhard Logier in 1813.

While the 1911 Encyclopaedia Britannica claims that Haliday called it the "Royal Kent Bugle" as a compliment to the duke of Kent, who was at the time commander-in-chief, and encouraged the introduction of the instrument into the regimental bands, this appears to be at least partly erroneous. The duke was never commander-in-chief of any bands in Europe, and the dedication might have been made by Holden. A Royal Kent bugle in the key of C, stamped with Halliday’s name as inventor, and made by P. Turton, 5 Wormwood Gate, Dublin, was exhibited by Col. Shaw-Hellier at the Royal Military Exhibition in 1890. The instrument, made of copper, measures , and the total length of the tubing, including the mouthpiece, .

Pitch
The instrument has a chromatic range of two octaves,  the open notes being: . 

To the original instrument specified in the patent, Halliday added a sixth key, which became the first and was in the normal position open; this key when closed gave B, with the same series of harmonics as the open tube. The series, however, becomes shorter with each successive key. Thus, on being opened, the second key gives , the third key , the fourth key , the fifth key , and the sixth key . The bore of the instrument is just wide enough in proportion to its length to make possible the playing of the fundamental tones in the first two series, but these notes are never used, and the harmonics above the sixth are also avoided, being of doubtful intonation. In the ophicleide, the bass variety of the key bugle, the bore is sufficiently wide to produce fundamentals of a satisfactory quality.

The keyed bugle was chiefly used in B, a crook for B being frequently added to the bugle in C.

References

Further reading

See also
 Bugle
 Ophicleide

Brass instruments